Hymie Liechtenstein (April 15, 1904 – December 28, 1999), better known as Harry Monty, was a Polish-American actor, dwarf actor and stuntman, whose most notable role was as a Munchkin and a winged monkey in the Wizard of Oz.

Career 
Monty began his career in vaudeville, and appeared in various films from the 1930s to the 1970s, often uncredited. He appeared in Wizard of Oz in 1939 as a Munchkin, and also as one of the Winged Monkeys. He later said he considered his role as a Munchkin to be the most important of all his roles on stage and film in his 50-year career. His other film roles were in movies including Hellzapoppin', The Court Jester, Planet of the Apes, Papillon, a production of Swiss Family Robinson, Three Ring Circus, Hello, Dolly!, and as a rotoscope reference actor in the 1978 animated film The Lord of the Rings.

He also served as a stuntperson in the films Tarzan Finds a Son!, Bad Bascomb, River of No Return, and Earthquake.

Monty also appeared in the television series Lost in Space, Bonanza, Bewitched, and H.R. Pufnstuf.

He died in December 1999 at the age of 95.

Filmography 

Wizard of Oz (1939) – Munchkin Soldier / Winged Monkey (uncredited)
Hellzapoppin' (1941) – Midget Taxi Driver (uncredited)
Ride 'Em Cowboy (1942) – Midget in Pool (uncredited)
Tarzan's New York Adventure (1942) – Minor Role (uncredited)
Ghost Catchers (1944) – Midget (uncredited)
See My Lawyer (1945) – Strong Man / Chauffeur (uncredited)
George White's Scandals (1945) – Box Gag (uncredited)
An Angel Comes to Brooklyn (1945) – Midget Musician (uncredited)
Anna and the King of Siam (1946) – Midget Page Boy (uncredited)
Crack-Up (1946) – Midget in Arcade (uncredited)
Alias the Champ (1949) – Giant Killer (uncredited)
Invaders from Mars (1953) – Mutant (uncredited)
River of No Return (1954) – Young Man (uncredited)
3 Ring Circus (1954) – Circus Midget Clown (uncredited)
The Court Jester (1955) – One of Hermine's Midgets (uncredited)
The Flying Fontaines (1959) – Clown (uncredited)
Mysterious Island (1961) – (uncredited)
How the West Was Won (1962) – Pirate (uncredited)
The Brass Bottle (1964) – Midget Gong Man (uncredited)
Our Man Flint (1966) – Minor Role (uncredited)
Planet of the Apes (1968) – Child Ape (uncredited)
Hello, Dolly! (1969) – Midget (uncredited)
Papillon (1973) – (uncredited)
The Lord of the Rings (1978) – (voice)
Hometown U.S.A. (1979) – Bellhop
Americathon (1979) – Act

References

External links 
 

1904 births
1999 deaths
20th-century American male actors
Actors with dwarfism
American male film actors
American male television actors
American people of Polish descent
American stunt performers
Vaudeville performers